Rima Varzhapetyan-Feller is an Armenian woman of Jewish origin. She has been the president of the Jewish Community of Armenia since 1996, a community which currently stands at 1,000 people, despite Jews being present in Armenia since the days of Tigranes the Great. She is also a member of the European Jewish Parliament, representing Armenia.

She has campaigned for the recognition of the Armenian genocide, especially by Israel, even sending an open letter to the Knesset in 2012.

Controversies

Refuting claims of Antisemitism in Armenia 
Organizations like the Anti-Defamation League and some media outlets in the United States have reported that Armenia is probably the most anti-Semitic member of the former USSR countries, with over half of the population harboring anti-Semitic attitudes, according to some sources. Varzhapetyan has refuted those sources.

Accusations of glorifying of Nazi collaborators
On Apr. 28, 2015, Arye Gut, an Israeli of Azerbaijani origin, accused Varzhapetyan of not denouncing the publication of anti-semitic books in Armenia and the glorification of Drastamat Kanayan, leader of the Armenian Legion and collaborator with Nazi Germany during World War II. This letter prompted a response sent to the Jewish Journal by Varzhapetyan and moreover, Varzhapetyan has come against Israeli and U.S. Jewish newspapers where these anti-Armenian articles have been published, as well as criticizing the leadership of Azerbaijan for whitewashing the image of Azerbaijan in the eyes of Israel and the U.S. Jewish community.

Personal life
Varzhapetyan-Feller is a mechanical engineer, married and has two sons.

References 

Armenian Jews
Jews and Judaism in Armenia
Armenia–Azerbaijan relations